Yetto was a ground level stopping place during the passenger transport days of this line, and a 1965 reference mentioned that it was no longer used at that date. It was in what is now the suburb of Morphett Vale

The stop is now completely disused, the entire Willunga railway line having been dismantled in 1972 and later replaced by the 
Coast to Vines Rail Trail.

Photos 

 
 
Photo of the former location of Yetto Railway Station. - May 2019

References

Australian Railway Historical Society Bulletin No 336, October 1965

Disused railway stations in South Australia